Sir Peter Courthorpe (1624 – 1680)  was an Irish politician.

Courthorpe was educated at  Trinity College, Dublin.

Courthorpe represented Monaghan Borough from 1613 until 1615.

References

17th-century Irish people
Irish MPs 1661–1666
Members of the Parliament of Ireland (pre-1801) for County Cork constituencies
Alumni of Trinity College Dublin
1624 births
1680 deaths